The men's taijiquan two events combined competition (Taijiquan and Taijijian) at the 2002 Asian Games in Busan, South Korea was held from 11 to 12 October at the Dongseo University Minseok Sports Center.

Schedule
All times are Korea Standard Time (UTC+09:00)

Results
Legend
DNS — Did not start

References

2002 Asian Games Report, Page 787
Results

Men's taijiquan